Delores Phillips (26 September 1950 – 7 June 2014) was an American author who is known for her acclaimed debut novel, The Darkest Child  (Soho Press, 2005). Born in Georgia, Phillips explores the racial dynamics of the 1950s rural South in her book. She graduated from Cleveland State University and worked as a nurse in a facility for abused women and children in Cleveland. Her poetry has appeared in Jean’s Journal, Black Times, and The Crisis. She died at the age of 63.

Publication
The Darkest Child. Soho Press, 2005. 

The Darkest Child, New Edition with introduction by Tayari Jones. Soho Press, 2018.

References

External links
SOHO Press Homepage
Clutch Magazine

21st-century American women writers
Cleveland State University alumni
Novelists from Georgia (U.S. state)
Place of birth missing
2014 deaths
1950 births
20th-century African-American people
21st-century African-American writers
African-American novelists
American women novelists
American nurses
American women nurses
20th-century African-American women
21st-century African-American women writers
African-American nurses